The 48th Grand Bell Awards, also known as Daejong Film Awards, are determined and presented annually by The Motion Pictures Association of Korea for excellence in film in South Korea. The Grand Bell Awards were first presented in 1962 and have gained prestige as the Korean equivalent of the American Academy Awards.

48th ceremony
The 48th Grand Bell Awards ceremony was held at the Sejong Center for the Performing Arts in Seoul on October 17, 2011 and hosted by Shin Hyun-joon and Jang Seo-hee.

Nominations and winners
(Winners denoted in bold)

References

External links 
 

Grand Bell Awards
Grand Bell Awards
Grand Bell Awards